The Television Licences (Disclosure of Information) Act 2000 (c.15) is an Act of the Parliament of the United Kingdom. It allows social security information to be provided by the government in order to facilitate no fee or fee-reduced TV licences.

References

External links
 Explanatory notes to the Television Licences (Disclosure of Information) Act 2000 from the Office of Public Sector Information.

United Kingdom Acts of Parliament 2000